Mozgovoy or Mozgovoi is a Russian masculine surname; its feminine counterpart is Mozgovaya or Mozgovaia. Notable people with the surname include:

 Aleksey Mozgovoy (1975–2015), pro-Russian separatist leader in the Lugansk Republic
Bogdan Mozgovoi (born 2000), Russian Paralympic swimmer
 Mykola Mozhovyy (1947–2010), Ukrainian and Soviet composer, producer, and songwriter
Natasha Mozgovaya (born 1979), American-Israeli journalist

Russian-language surnames